Sun Zheng is a Chinese racing driver. He won the national class of the British Formula Three Championship when chief rival Ed Jones decided against racing in the final round at the Nurburgring.

Career
Sun was the 2012 China Formula Grand Prix series champion and finished fourth overall in 2012 Audi R8 LMS Cup.

Sun competed in the 2013 Macau Grand Prix, driving for Galaxy Double R Racing. He is the first F3 racer from mainland China to enter the race.

References

External links

British F3 Sun Zheng driver profile

Living people
Chinese racing drivers
British Formula Three Championship drivers
Year of birth missing (living people)
Double R Racing drivers
Blancpain Endurance Series drivers